Sernokorba is a genus of ground spiders that was first described by T. Kamura in 1992.  it contains the following species: 
Sernokorba fanjing Song, Zhu & Zhang, 2004 – China
Sernokorba pallidipatellis (Bösenberg & Strand, 1906) – Russia (Far East), China, Korea, Japan
Sernokorba tescorum (Simon, 1914) – France, Spain.

References

Araneomorphae genera
Gnaphosidae
Spiders of Asia